Delafield Herbert "Del" Kennedy (31 July 1923 – 26 November 2015) was  a former Australian rules footballer who played with Footscray in the Victorian Football League (VFL).	

Kennedy played 72 games with Camberwell in the VFA from 1946 to 1950.

Notes

External links 
		
		
Herald Sun obituary

1923 births
2015 deaths
Australian rules footballers from Victoria (Australia)
Western Bulldogs players
Braybrook Football Club players
Camberwell Football Club players